Ryu Kwang-ho (born 20 October 1993) is a North Korean footballer. He represented North Korea on at least one occasion in 2014.

Career statistics

International

References

External links

1993 births
Living people
North Korean footballers
North Korea youth international footballers
North Korea international footballers
Association football defenders